Bayola is one of the forty subbarrios of Santurce, San Juan, Puerto Rico.

It's located between Expreso Baldorioty de Castro to the south, Calle Wilson to the north, Avenida de Diego to the east and Primavera Street to the west.

Bayola comprises just 4 streets. These are Calle Estrella, Calle Tres Hermanos, Calle Washington and Calle Julian Blanco.

Demographics
In 2000, Bayola had a population of 564.

In 2010, Bayola had a population of 748 and a population density of 24,933.3 persons per square mile.

Gallery

See also 
 
 List of communities in Puerto Rico

References

Santurce, San Juan, Puerto Rico
Municipality of San Juan